Joseph Chilton Pearce (January 14, 1926 – August 23, 2016) was an American author of a number of books on human development and child development and is best known for his books, The Crack in the Cosmic Egg (1971), Magical Child (1977) and The Bond of Power: Meditation and Wholeness (1981). He preferred the name "Joe".

Early life and background
Pearce was born January 14, 1926, in Pineville, Kentucky, US. He served in the U.S. Army Air Corps during World War II. He graduated with a BA from the College of William and Mary in Williamsburg, Virginia, received a Master of Arts degree from Indiana University, and did post-graduate studies at Geneva Theological College in Beaver Falls, Pennsylvania.

Career
Pearce taught college humanities until the mid-1960s, and thereafter devoted himself to writing and lecturing. In the following decades, he has written on themes ranging from child development, mind-heart connection and themes in spirituality, in over 12 books.

He presented the idea of the heart, or compassionate mind, as a category of brain function equal in stature to the thalamus, prefrontal cortex and lower brain. Pearce believed that active, imaginative play is the most important of all childhood activities because it cultivates mastery of one's environment, which he terms "creative competence." Children denied that form of play develop feelings of isolation and anxiety. He also believed that child-parent bonding is crucial, and sees modern clinical childbirth and lack of breast feeding as obstructions to that bonding.

In the 1970-1980s Pearce practiced meditation under the guidance of Swami Muktananda, and he wrote a book about that subject, The Bond of Power.

Pearce died in August 2016 at the age of 90.

Bibliography
 The Crack in the Cosmic Egg: Challenging Constructs of Mind and Reality (1971) and multiple later editions. **
 Exploring the Crack in the Cosmic Egg - Split Minds and Meta-Realities (1974) 
 Magical Child (1977) 
 The Bond of Power: Meditation and Wholeness (1982) 
 Magical Child Matures (1985) 
 Evolution's End: Claiming the Potential of Our Intelligence (1992) 
 The Crack in the Cosmic Egg: New Constructs of Mind and Reality (2002) 
 The Biology of Transcendence: A Blueprint of the Human Spirit (2002) 
 Spiritual Initiation and the Breakthrough of Consciousness: The Bond of Power (2003) 
 
 Death of Religion and the Rebirth of Spirit: A Return to the Intelligence of the Heart  (2007) 
 
 The Heart-Mind Matrix: How the Heart Can Teach the Mind New Ways to Think (2012) 

References

Mercogliano, Chris (2003) Teaching the Restless: One School's Remarkable No-Ritalin Approach 
Rosemond, John (2001) New Parent Power! 
Peirsman, Etienne and Peirsman, Neeto (2006) Craniosacral Therapy for Babies and Small Children''

External links

Joseph Chilton Pearce Library at The Touch the Future Academy
Kindred Media and Community articles and interviews: http://kindredmedia.org/author/joseph-chilton-pearce/

 Joseph Chilton Pearce website at http://www.JosephChiltonPearce.org  
Institute for Applied Meditation : Interview with Joseph Chilton Pearce
Waking Up To The Holographic Heart : Joseph Chilton Pearce 1998 Interview
Touch The Future : Bio page and links
EnlightenNext : Bio page and bibliography

1926 births
2016 deaths
American family and parenting writers
American social sciences writers
American spiritual writers
College of William & Mary alumni
Geneva College alumni
Indiana University alumni
New Age writers
People from Bell County, Kentucky
United States Army Air Forces personnel of World War II